Abu Bakr Atiku (1782–1842) was the third Sultan of the Sokoto Caliphate, reigning from October 1837 until November 1842.

Early years
Abu Bakr Atiku dan Shehu was born to the second wife of Usman dan Fodio in 1782.  He was involved, as were all his siblings, in studies directed by his father in Degel until the family and some followers were exiled in 1804. Like his brother Muhammed Bello and his sister Nana Asma’u, he dedicated significant part of his early years to study and wrote poetry, history, and on Islamic studies.  Many of his works of history and poetry survive and are considered key texts of the era.

In 1815, when Usman dan Fodio died, he briefly contested his brother Muhammed Bello for control of the Sokoto Caliphate.  The bloodless succession struggle ended with Bello the Sultan of the Caliphate and Atiku imprisoned for one year.  When he was released, he became and adviser to Mohammed Bello for the remainder of Bello's life.

Sultan
Atiku became the Sultan in 1837 when his brother Muhammed Bello died.  Atiku was disliked by some of the Emirs of the Caliphate who tried to organize for other candidates, but Atiku was quickly named the successor to his brother.

Atiku attempted to reverse some of the policies of Bello that he considered extravagant.  He banned dancing and music and made instruction in the Caliphate much more rigid.  In addition, although Bello had operated his administration out of Wurno for the final years of his life, Atiku moved the capital back to Sokoto.

However, his reign was highly unpopular to both the population and the Emirs of the Caliphate.  At the end of his reign, the tension came to a fore when he recognized an autonomous leader carving out the Adamawa Emirate.  Modibo Adama has fought in the Fulani war with Atiku's father Usman dan Fodio. Atiku saw an opportunity to support a ruler more loyal to him in Hamman Sambo and so recognized an independent Emirate under Hamman Sambo that took a significant part of the Adamawa territory.  Adama threatened to leave the Sokoto Caliphate and instead join the Ottoman Caliphate as a result of the situation.  The Adamawa Emirate was close to civil war until emissaries arrived revealing that Atiku had died and his successor had quickly reversed the decision to recognize Sambo.

Atiku was wounded during a campaign he led against the die-hards of "Tsibiri" in the autumn of 1842. He would succumb from his wounds on November 23, 1842, and was succeeded by his nephew Ali Babba bin Bello, one week after his death.

Lineage
One of his sons was Ahmadu Atiku, the fifth Sultan, and another son was `Abd ar-Rahman dan Abi Bakar, the eleventh Sultan of the Sokoto Caliphate.  His grandson was Muhammadu Attahiru I, final sultan of the independent Sokoto Caliphate.

References

1782 births
1842 deaths
Sultans of Sokoto
19th-century rulers in Africa
19th-century Nigerian people
Dan Fodio family
18th-century Nigerian people